Florian Fuchs (born 10 November 1991) is a German former field hockey player who played as a forward.

Career
At the 2012 Summer Olympics, he competed for the national team in the men's tournament. After the 2016 Summer Olympic, where he won the bronze medal, he transferred from Hamburg to Dutch club Bloemendaal. In the 2018–19 season, he won his first national title by defeating Kampong in the Dutch championship final with Bloemendaal. On 28 May 2021, he was named in the squads for the 2021 EuroHockey Championship and the 2020 Summer Olympics. Fuchs was named the FIH Young Player of the Year in 2012.

In September 2021, Fuchs announced that he was retiring from international hockey. After the following season he also retired from club hockey. In his last season with Bloemendaal he won the Euro Hockey League and the Dutch national title.

Honours

International
Germany
Olympic gold medal: 2012
EuroHockey Championship: 2011, 2013
Champions Trophy, 2014
Germany U21
Junior World Cup: 2009

Club
UHC Hamburg
Euro Hockey League: 2009–10, 2011–12

Bloemendaal
Hoofdklasse: 2018–19, 2020–21, 2021–22
Euro Hockey League: 2017–18, 2021, 2022

Individual
FIH Rising Star of the Year: 2012

References

External links
 
 
 

1991 births
Living people
Field hockey players from Hamburg
German male field hockey players
Male field hockey forwards
2010 Men's Hockey World Cup players
Field hockey players at the 2012 Summer Olympics
2014 Men's Hockey World Cup players
Field hockey players at the 2016 Summer Olympics
Field hockey players at the 2020 Summer Olympics
2018 Men's Hockey World Cup players
Olympic field hockey players of Germany
Olympic gold medalists for Germany
Olympic bronze medalists for Germany
Olympic medalists in field hockey
Medalists at the 2012 Summer Olympics
Medalists at the 2016 Summer Olympics
HC Bloemendaal players
Uhlenhorster HC players
Men's Hoofdklasse Hockey players
Men's Feldhockey Bundesliga players